Hammer Smashed Face is the debut EP and single by American death metal band Cannibal Corpse, released in 1993 by Metal Blade Records. There are two versions of the release, a single version that features the title song "Hammer Smashed Face" with two covers of songs by Black Sabbath and Possessed, and the EP version which includes the three tracks of the single version along with two original Cannibal Corpse tracks. The single version and the EP version both have different cover artwork.

Critical reception
"Hammer Smashed Face" is the band's most popular song, mainly due to a shortened version appearing in the 1994 comedy film Ace Ventura: Pet Detective. Since it is included on Tomb of the Mutilated, it was banned from Germany until June 2006, when it was played at a 2006 performance at Essen.

When asked if he had a favorite Cannibal Corpse album, singer Chris Barnes described the Hammer Smashed EP as "one of the underrated ones". Barnes also hailed the group's cover of Black Sabbath's "Zero the Hero" as "one of the greatest".

Track listing

Personnel

Cannibal Corpse
Chris Barnes – vocals
Bob Rusay – lead guitar
Jack Owen – rhythm guitar
Alex Webster – bass
Paul Mazurkiewicz – drums

Production 
Scott Burns, Dennis Fura and Cannibal Corpse – producer

References

1993 EPs
Cannibal Corpse albums
Metal Blade Records EPs
Cannibal Corpse songs